James Norman Cupp (28 March 1921 – 2 June 2004) was a United States Marine Corps aviator during World War II. Cupp was a double flying ace with at least 12 aerial victories in the Solomon Islands during three months of World War II. He was a recipient of the Navy Cross, the navy's second highest military decoration for valor and was a four time recipient of the Distinguished Flying Cross. Also a Korean War veteran, he retired as a colonel to Manassas, Virginia, in 1968.

Early life
James Norman Cupp was born in Corning, Iowa, on 28 March 1921. He graduated from high school in Red Oak, Iowa, in 1938. He attended the University of Iowa for two years, taking his Sophomore finals two months early so he could join the Navy V-5 flight training program. In college, Cupp was an avid swimmer and diver. He was also a member of Dolphin Fraternity, a national honorary swimming organization.

Naval career

World War II
Cupp enlisted in the Navy on 15 May 1941 and entered the V-5 flight training program. He graduated at Naval Air Station Corpus Christi, Texas 9 January 1942 and was commissioned a second lieutenant in the United States Marine Corps, 27 February 1942. On 3 March 1942, he married Daphne Snider, of Fairfield, Iowa. Cupp then attended aerial photography training at Naval Air Station Pensacola, Florida.

Cupp was attached to VMF-213, the Hell Hawks, in September 1942 at Marine Corps Air Station Ewa and later flew the Vought F4U Corsair. He had his crew paint Daphne "C", for his wife, on the engine cowling of his Corsair. He arrived at the Solomon Islands for his first combat tour on 3 April 1943. Cupp scored his first aerial victory on 15 July 1943 and was an ace three days later. During his tour he was credited with 13 1/2 or 13 aerial victories based on reports by his wingmen. According to Guttman (2005), he was officially credited with 12 victories.

On 20 September 1943, Captain Cupp was shot down north of Kolombangara by a G4M1 Betty with an improvised gun unexpectedly mounted in its bomb bay; he was severely burned. He spent the next 18 months in hospitals, primarily Oak Knoll Naval Hospital in Oakland, California. After that, he served as a Naval flight instructor. The war ended before he could return to the Pacific theater.

Later career
Cupp served in the Korean War and received his fourth Distinguished Flying Cross for service during the Battle of Chosin Reservoir where he was an air officer on the ground, responsible for directing close air support operations.

After World War II, he served as commanding officer for VMO-6 in Tsingtao, China, HQ Squadron, 1st Marine Aircraft Wing in Tientsin, China, Marine Detachment (MARDET) Naval Air Station New Orleans, MARDET Naval Air Station Glenview, VMFT-10 at Marine Corps Air Station El Toro and Marine Air Control Squadron 1 in Taiwan.

Colonel Cupp retired to Manassas, Virginia, in 1968, selling real estate until 1973. He died on 2 June 2004 and was buried at Stonewall Memory Gardens, Manassas, Virginia.

Awards and honors
His decorations include the Navy Cross, four Distinguished Flying Cross awards, Bronze Star Medal with "V" Device, Purple Heart, Air Medal, Navy Commendation Medal with "V" Device, four Presidential Unit Citations and other campaign awards.

Navy Cross citation

Bibliography

See also
 List of World War II aces from the United States

References

External links
 
 
 
 

1921 births
2004 deaths
United States Marine Corps personnel of the Korean War
American World War II flying aces
Aviators from Iowa
People from Corning, Iowa
People from Manassas, Virginia
People from Red Oak, Iowa
Recipients of the Air Medal
Recipients of the Distinguished Flying Cross (United States)
Recipients of the Navy Cross (United States)
Shot-down aviators
United States Marine Corps pilots of World War II
United States Marine Corps colonels
University of Iowa alumni
Military personnel from Iowa